Kennedia stirlingii, commonly known as bushy kennedia, is a species of flowering plant in the family Fabaceae and is endemic to the south-west of Western Australia. It is a trailing or twining shrub with trifoliate leaves and orange-red flowers.

Description

Taxonomy
Kennedia stirlingii was first formally described in 1844 by John Lindley in Edwards's Botanical Register. The specific epithet (stirlingii) honours James Stirling.

Distribution and habitat
Bushy kennedia grows on granite outcrop, hillsides and moist areas in the Avon Wheatbelt, Jarrah Forest and Swan Coastal Plain biogeographic regions in south-western Western Australia.

Conservation status
Kennedia stirlingii is listed as "not threatened" under the Western Australian Biodiversity Conservation Act 2016.

References

Fabales of Australia
Plants described in 1844
Rosids of Western Australia
stirlingii
Taxa named by John Lindley